Giorgi Antsukhelidze (18 August 1984 –  9–10 August 2008) was a Georgian soldier who was murdered during the hostilities in South Ossetia in the course of the Russia–Georgia war of August 2008. He is the subject of two Internet videos showing his interrogation and torture by the South Ossetian militants. He was posthumously awarded the Order of National Hero by the Georgian government in 2013.

Military service and death  
Giorgi Antsukhelidze was born in 1984 in the village of Alvani in the highland Akhmeta district in northeast Georgia. He was conscripted in the Georgian Armed Forces in 2001. He then served in various units of the Georgian infantry headquartered at Senaki and then at Vaziani. Junior Sergeant Antsukhelidze took his service as an assistant gunner in the 41st Battalion of the 4th Infantry Brigade during the Russia–Georgia war of August 2008. He went missing in action on 9 August 2008 during the battle of Tskhinvali as the Georgian forces were advancing into the Shankhai district of Tskhinvali, and was considered as such until December 2008, when his body was identified using DNA testing among those retrieved from the South Ossetian military. He was buried at the fraternal cemetery of Georgian soldiers at Mukhatgverdi near Tbilisi. He was survived by his wife Maka Chikviladze and two children.

Allegations of torture  
In January 2009 two video recordings emerged on the Internet showing soldiers in the South Ossetian uniforms torturing a captured Georgian soldier whom the relatives identified as Antsukhelidze. The video footage shows the militants, speaking in Ossetian and Georgian, interrogating the prisoner, forcing him to kneel and ordering him to kiss the earth. The captured soldier in a Georgian uniform is shown being repeatedly beaten and replying to each question: "I have no idea". One of the torturers is heard shouting in Ossetian: "Look, what a tough guy!". In April 2010, the Georgian non-governmental organization Georgian Young Lawyer's Association filed a claim to the European Court of Human Rights in favor of the Antsukhelidze family. The claim refers to facts of torture and murder by Russian and Ossetian militaries. A high-ranking South Ossetian officer, Soslan Pukhayev, claimed by the Georgian reports to have been associated with the murder of Antsukhelidze, was arrested by the Georgian police in July 2009.

Awards and memory  
On 15 April 2013 President of Georgia Mikheil Saakashvili posthumously awarded Giorgi Antsukhelidze the Order of National Hero. Antsukhelidze had earlier been awarded the Order of Vakhtang Gorgasali, 1st Class. Antsukhelidze's name was given to a NCO school operated by the Ministry of Defense of Georgia in November 2013. He was also honored by President Giorgi Margvelashvili in his inaugural speech in November 2013.

References 
 

1984 births
2008 deaths
Military personnel from Georgia (country)
Military personnel killed in the Russo-Georgian War
Prisoners of war from Georgia (country)
Torture victims from Georgia (country)
National Heroes of Georgia
People from Kakheti
Military personnel missing in action